Anchawadi  is a commune in the Cercle of Gao in the Gao Region of southeastern Mali. Its principal town isDjebock. In 1998 it had a population of 7392.

References

Communes of Gao Region